The Colorado Rockies' 2004 season was the 12th for the Rockies, attempting to win the National League West. Clint Hurdle was the manager. They played home games at Coors Field. They finished with a record of 68-94, 4th in the NL West.

Offseason
December 2, 2003: Juan Uribe was traded by the Colorado Rockies to the Chicago White Sox for Aaron Miles.
December 11, 2003: Vinny Castilla was signed as a free agent by the Colorado Rockies.
December 14, 2003: Justin Speier was traded by the Colorado Rockies as part of a 3-team deal to the Toronto Blue Jays for a player to be named later from Toronto and Joe Kennedy from the Tampa Bay Devil Rays.  The Toronto Blue Jays sent Sandy Nin (minors) (December 15, 2003) to the Colorado Rockies to complete the trade.
January 9, 2004: Jeromy Burnitz and Royce Clayton were signed as free agents by the Colorado Rockies.
March 8, 2004: Shawn Estes was signed as a free agent by the Colorado Rockies.

Regular season

Season standings

National League West

Record vs. opponents

Summary
Having missed the first 68 games of the season due to a groin injury, right fielder Larry Walker's first three home runs of the season (video) came on June 25, 2004, versus the Cleveland Indians.  The last was off José Jiménez, which won the game for the Rockies in the 10th inning for a 10−8 margin.  Walker totaled four hits and five runs batted in (RBI) on the day, and it was his third career three-home run game.  

Walker reached 2,000 career hits on June 30, 2004, becoming the 234th player in major league history to do so (video).  Having already achieved 400 doubles, 300 home runs, 1,000 runs scored, and 1,000 RBI, he became the 40th player to reach all five totals.  The milestone hit was a double off Ben Sheets in the fourth inning versus the Milwaukee Brewers.  Through that point, Walker was the Rockies' career leader in 12 categories.

Transactions
July 22, 2004: Jamey Wright was signed as a free agent by the Colorado Rockies.
August 6, 2004: Traded right fielder Larry Walker to the St. Louis Cardinals for players to be named later and Jason Burch (minors). The St. Louis Cardinals sent Luis Martinez and Chris Narveson (August 11, 2004) to the Colorado Rockies to complete the trade.
September 27, 2004: Jhoulys Chacín was signed as an amateur free agent by the Colorado Rockies.

Major League debuts
Batters:
Luis González (Apr 6)
Matt Holliday (Apr 16)
Brad Hawpe (May 4)
Choo Freeman (Jun 4)
J.D. Closser (Jun 30)
Jorge Piedra (Aug 7)
Pitchers:
Scott Dohmann (May 15)
Allan Simpson (May 17)
Chris Gissell (Aug 22)
Jeff Francis (Aug 25)

Roster

Game log 

|-  bgcolor="ffbbbb"
|- align="center" bgcolor="bbffbb"
| 1 || April 6 || @ Diamondbacks || 6–2 || Estes (1–0) || Johnson (0–1) || || 46,949 || 1–0
|- align="center" bgcolor="ffbbbb"
| 2 || April 7 || @ Diamondbacks || 9–4 || Webb (1–0) || Jennings (0–1) || Mantei (1) || 25,918 || 1–1
|- align="center" bgcolor="ffbbbb"
| 3 || April 8 || @ Diamondbacks || 6–5 (11)|| Randolph (1–0) || Chacón (0–1) || || 26,448 || 1–2
|- align="center" bgcolor="ffbbbb"
| 4 || April 9 || @ Dodgers || 5–1 || Ishii (1–0) || Elarton (0–1) || Álvarez (1) || 54,599 || 1–3
|- align="center" bgcolor="ffbbbb"
| 5 || April 10 || @ Dodgers || 7–4 || Nomo (1–1) || Stark (0–1) || Gagné (1) || 35,318 || 1–4
|- align="center" bgcolor="bbffbb"
| 6 || April 11 || @ Dodgers || 4–2 || Estes (2–0) || Pérez (0–1) || Chacón (1) || 27,076 || 2–4
|- align="center" bgcolor="bbffbb"
| 7 || April 12 || Diamondbacks || 7–4 || Núñez (1–0) || Koplove (0–1) || Chacón (2) || 48,013 || 3–4
|- align="center" bgcolor="bbffbb"
| 8 || April 14 || Diamondbacks || 14–4 || Kennedy (1–0) || Dessens (0–1) || || 23,128 || 4–4
|- align="center" bgcolor="ffbbbb"
| 9 || April 15 || Diamondbacks || 11–10 || Koplove (1–1) || Elarton (0–2) || Mantei (2) || 22,320 || 4–5
|- align="center" bgcolor="ffbbbb"
| 10 || April 16 || @ Cardinals || 13–5 || Morris (2–1) || Stark (0–2) || || 34,541 || 4–6
|- align="center" bgcolor="ffbbbb"
| 11 || April 17 || @ Cardinals || 8–4 || Marquis (1–1) || Estes (2–1) || || 46,471 || 4–7
|- align="center" bgcolor="bbffbb"
| 12 || April 18 || @ Cardinals || 8–5 || Jennings (1–1) || Williams (0–1) || Chacón (3) || 34,697 || 5–7
|- align="center" bgcolor="bbffbb"
| 13 || April 20 || Dodgers || 7–1 || Kennedy (2–0) || Ishii (2–1) || || 22,169 || 6–7
|- align="center" bgcolor="ffbbbb"
| 14 || April 21 || Dodgers || 9–4 || Nomo (3–1) || Elarton (0–3) || || 21,685 || 6–8
|- align="center" bgcolor="bbffbb"
| 15 || April 22 || Dodgers || 7–1 (6) || Estes (3–1) || Lima (2–1) || || 19,667 || 7–8
|- align="center" bgcolor="ffbbbb"
| 16 || April 23 || Astros || 13–7 || Duckworth (1–0) || Jennings (1–2) || || 23,719 || 7–9
|- align="center" bgcolor="ffbbbb"
| 17 || April 24 || Astros || 8–5 || Clemens (4–0) || Fassero (0–1) || Dotel (2) || 35,260 || 7–10
|- align="center" bgcolor="bbffbb"
| 18 || April 25 || Astros || 4–1 || Kennedy (3–0) || Miller (2–2) || Chacón (4) || 30,912 || 8–10
|- align="center" bgcolor="ffbbbb"
| 19 || April 26 || Marlins || 6–3 || Pavano (2–0) || Elarton (0–4) || Benítez (10) || 20,009 || 8–11
|- align="center" bgcolor="bbffbb"
| 20 || April 27 || Marlins || 13–10 || Núñez (2–0) || Fox (0–1) || Chacón (5) || 20,615 || 9–11
|- align="center" bgcolor="ffbbbb"
| 21 || April 28 || Marlins || 9–4 || Beckett (2–2) || Jennings (1–3) || || 27,402 || 9–12
|-

|-  bgcolor="ffbbbb"
|- align="center" bgcolor="bbffbb"
| 22 || May 1 || Braves || 3–2 || Núñez (3–0) || Reitsma (1–1) || Chacón (6) || 30,176 || 10–12
|- align="center" bgcolor="ffbbbb"
| 23 || May 1 || Braves || 11–7 || Nitkowski (1–0) || Núñez (3–1) || || 24,272 || 10–13
|- align="center" bgcolor="bbffbb"
| 24 || May 2 || Braves || 13–4 || Estes (4–1) || Ramírez (0–3) || || 35,234 || 11–13
|- align="center" bgcolor="ffbbbb"
| 25 || May 4 || @ Expos || 10–4 || Vargas (2–1) || Jennings (1–4) || || 4,001 || 11–14
|- align="center" bgcolor="bbffbb"
| 26 || May 5 || @ Expos || 2–0 || Kennedy (4–0) || Day (2–3) || Chacón (7) || 3,609 || 12–14
|- align="center" bgcolor="ffbbbb"
| 27 || May 6 || @ Expos || 3–1 || Hernández (2–2) || Elarton (0–5) || || 8,851 || 12–15
|- align="center" bgcolor="ffbbbb"
| 28 || May 7 || @ Cubs || 11–0 || Zambrano (3–1) || Estes (4–2) || || 37,307 || 12–16
|- align="center" bgcolor="bbffbb"
| 29 || May 8 || @ Cubs || 4–3 || Jennings (2–4) || Maddux (2–3) || Chacón (8) || 39,546 || 13–16
|- align="center" bgcolor="ffbbbb"
| 30 || May 9 || @ Cubs || 5–4 (13) || Rusch (1–0) || Fassero (0–2) || || 39,155 || 13–17
|- align="center" bgcolor="ffbbbb"
| 31 || May 11 || Pirates || 15–10 (12) || Torres (2–1) || López (0–1) || || 21,123 || 13–18
|- align="center" bgcolor="bbffbb"
| 32 || May 13 || Pirates || 7–5 || Estes (5–2) || Benson (3–3) || Chacón (9) || || 14–18
|- align="center" bgcolor="ffbbbb"
| 33 || May 13 || Pirates || 11–2 || Pérez (3–1) || Jennings (2–5) || || 20,041 || 14–19
|- align="center" bgcolor="ffbbbb"
| 34 || May 14 || Phillies || 6–4 || Milton (4–0) || Kennedy (4–1) || Worrell (2) || 32,171 || 14–20
|- align="center" bgcolor="ffbbbb"
| 35 || May 15 || Phillies || 16–5 || Myers (2–2) || Elarton (0–6) || || 33,629 || 14–21
|- align="center" bgcolor="bbffbb"
| 36 || May 16 || Phillies || 7–6 || Harikkala (1–0) || Cormier (2–3) || Chacón (10) || 33,623 || 15–21
|- align="center" bgcolor="bbffbb"
| 37 || May 17 || Phillies || 7–6 || Fuentes (1–0) || Worrell (0–1) || || 22,111 || 16–21
|- align="center" bgcolor="bbffbb"
| 38 || May 18 || @ Reds || 8–3 || Estes (6–2) || Lidle (2–4) || || 17,389 || 17–21
|- align="center" bgcolor="ffbbbb"
| 39 || May 19 || @ Reds || 4–3 (10) || Riedling (2–0) || Fuentes (1–1) || || 16,410 || 17–22
|- align="center" bgcolor="ffbbbb"
| 40 || May 20 || @ Reds || 3–1 || Wilson (6–0) || Kennedy (4–2) || Graves (18) || 21,576 || 17–23
|- align="center" bgcolor="ffbbbb"
| 41 || May 21 || @ Mets || 9–7 || Ginter (1–0) || Young (0–1) || || 20,148 || 17–24
|- align="center" bgcolor="ffbbbb"
| 42 || May 22 || @ Mets || 5–4 || Weathers (4–1) || Núñez (3–2) || Looper (7) || 27,526 || 17–25
|- align="center" bgcolor="ffbbbb"
| 43 || May 23 || @ Mets || 4–0 || Glavine (6–2) || Estes (6–3) || || 37,486 || 17–26
|- align="center" bgcolor="ffbbbb"
| 44 || May 25 || Padres || 11–6 || Linebrink (2–0) || Fassero (0–3) || || 33,799 || 17–27
|- align="center" bgcolor="bbffbb"
| 45 || May 26 || Padres || 13–6 || Jennings (3–5) || Eaton (1–5) || || 28,129 || 18–27
|- align="center" bgcolor="ffbbbb"
| 46 || May 27 || Padres || 4–3 (10) || Otsuka (4–2) || Núñez (3–3) || Hoffman (12) || 24,543 || 18–28
|- align="center" bgcolor="ffbbbb"
| 47 || May 28 || @ Giants || 4–2 || Brower (2–3) || Chacón (0–2) || || 39,983 || 18–29
|- align="center" bgcolor="ffbbbb"
| 48 || May 29 || @ Giants || 5–3 || Williams (4–3) || Fassero (0–4) || Herges (15) || 42,297 || 18–30
|- align="center" bgcolor="ffbbbb"
| 49 || May 30 || @ Giants || 3–1 || Schmidt (6–2) || Kennedy (4–3) || Herges (16) || 42,463 || 18–31
|- align="center" bgcolor="bbffbb"
| 50 || May 31 || @ Padres || 7–1 || Jennings (4–5) || Eaton (1–6) || || 38,355 || 19–31
|-

|-  bgcolor="ffbbbb"
|- align="center" bgcolor="bbffbb"
| 51 || June 1 || @ Padres || 7–1 || Cook (1–0) || Germano (1–1) || || 28,313 || 20–31
|- align="center" bgcolor="ffbbbb"
| 52 || June 2 || @ Padres || 2–1 (10) || Hoffman (1–0) || Fuentes (1–2) || || 38,521 || 20–32
|- align="center" bgcolor="ffbbbb"
| 53 || June 4 || Giants || 13–7 || Schmidt (7–2) || Fassero (0–5) || || 32,093 || 20–33
|- align="center" bgcolor="bbffbb"
| 54 || June 5 || Giants || 11–2 || Jennings (5–5) || Rueter (2–5) || || 30,149 || 21–33
|- align="center" bgcolor="ffbbbb"
| 55 || June 6 || Giants || 16–4 || Hermanson (2–2) || Cook (1–1) || || 37,147 || 21–34
|- align="center" bgcolor="ffbbbb"
| 56 || June 7 || Giants || 10–5 || Brower (3–3) || Reed (0–1) || || 20,887 || 21–35
|- align="center" bgcolor="ffbbbb"
| 57 || June 8 || @ Yankees || 2–1 || Vázquez (7–4) || Fassero (0–6) || Rivera (24) || 51,852 || 21–36
|- align="center" bgcolor="ffbbbb"
| 58 || June 9 || @ Yankees || 7–5 || Quantrill (5–2) || Kennedy (4–4) || Rivera (25) || 38,013 || 21–37
|- align="center" bgcolor="ffbbbb"
| 59 || June 10 || @ Yankees || 10–4 || Contreras (3–2) || Jennings (5–6) || || 41,586 || 21–38
|- align="center" bgcolor="ffbbbb"
| 60 || June 11 || @ Devil Rays || 8–7 (10) || Báez (3–1) || Chacón (0–3) || || 9,280 || 21–39
|- align="center" bgcolor="ffbbbb"
| 61 || June 12 || @ Devil Rays || 10–7 || Halama (2–1) || Harikkala (1–1) || || 11,299 || 21–40
|- align="center" bgcolor="ffbbbb"
| 62 || June 13 || @ Devil Rays || 3–2 || Colomé (1–0) || Chacón (0–4) || || 11,227 || 21–41
|- align="center" bgcolor="bbffbb"
| 63 || June 15 || Red Sox || 6–3 || Kennedy (5–4) || Arroyo (2–5) || Chacón (11) || 40,489 || 22–41
|- align="center" bgcolor="bbffbb"
| 64 || June 16 || Red Sox || 7–6 || Jennings (6–6) || Schilling (8–4) || Chacón (12) || 39,319 || 23–41
|- align="center" bgcolor="ffbbbb"
| 65 || June 17 || Red Sox || 11–0 || Lowe (6–5) || Cook (1–2) || || 40,088 || 23–42
|- align="center" bgcolor="bbffbb"
| 66 || June 18 || Orioles || 5–3 || Estes (7–3) || Ponson (3–9) || Chacón (13) || 30,148 || 24–42
|- align="center" bgcolor="bbffbb"
| 67 || June 19 || Orioles || 11–6 || Fassero (1–6) || DuBose (4–6) || || 33,326 || 25–42
|- align="center" bgcolor="ffbbbb"
| 68 || June 20 || Orioles || 4–2 || Ryan (2–2) || Chacón (0–5) || Julio (10) || 40,532 || 25–43
|- align="center" bgcolor="ffbbbb"
| 69 || June 22 || @ Brewers || 6–2 || Davis (7–5) || López (0–2) || || 13,264 || 25–44
|- align="center" bgcolor="bbffbb"
| 70 || June 23 || @ Brewers || 3–2 || Estes (8–3) || Capuano (2–3) || Chacón (14) || 19,964 || 26–44
|- align="center" bgcolor="bbffbb"
| 71 || June 24 || @ Brewers || 3–0 || Cook (2–2) || Sheets (6–5) || Chacón (15) || 21,224 || 27–44
|- align="center" bgcolor="bbffbb"
| 72 || June 25 || @ Indians || 10–8 (10) || Reed (1–1) || Jiménez (1–6) || Chacón (16) || 22,642 || 28–44
|- align="center" bgcolor="ffbbbb"
| 73 || June 26 || @ Indians || 4–3 (12) || Robertson (1–0) || Reed (1–2) || || 29,124 || 28–45
|- align="center" bgcolor="ffbbbb"
| 74 || June 27 || @ Indians || 5–3 || Miller (2–0) || Jennings (6–7) || Jiménez (8) || 27,252 || 28–46
|- align="center" bgcolor="ffbbbb"
| 75 || June 29 || Brewers || 6–3 || Capuano (3–3) || Estes (8–4) || Kolb (22) || 28,085 || 28–47
|- align="center" bgcolor="ffbbbb"
| 76 || June 30 || Brewers || 5–4 || Sheets (7–5) || Cook (2–3) || Kolb (23) || 24,126 || 28–48
|-

|-  bgcolor="ffbbbb"
|- align="center" bgcolor="ffbbbb"
| 77 || July 1 || Brewers || 10–9 || Santos (7–3) || Stark (0–3) || Kolb (24) || 24,360 || 28–49
|- align="center" bgcolor="bbffbb"
| 78 || July 2 || Tigers || 9–8 (10) || Chacón (1–5) || Walker (1–3) || || 47,585 || 29–49
|- align="center" bgcolor="bbffbb"
| 79 || July 3 || Tigers || 11–6 || Jennings (7–7) || Maroth (5–6) || || 48,131 || 30–49
|- align="center" bgcolor="bbffbb"
| 80 || July 4 || Tigers || 10–8 || Bernero (1–0) || Knotts (4–3) || Chacón (17) || 26,944 || 31–49
|- align="center" bgcolor="bbffbb"
| 81 || July 5 || @ Giants || 7–4 || Cook (3–3) || Tomko (3–5) || Chacón (18) || 39,977 || 32–49
|- align="center" bgcolor="bbffbb"
| 82 || July 6 || @ Giants || 8–6 || Harikkala (2–1) || Christiansen (1–2) || Chacón (19) || 35,460 || 33–49
|- align="center" bgcolor="ffbbbb"
| 83 || July 7 || @ Giants || 8–4 || Rueter (5–6) || Bernero (1–1) || || 35,673 || 33–50
|- align="center" bgcolor="bbffbb"
| 84 || July 8 || @ Padres || 5–1 || Jennings (8–7) || Eaton (4–8) || || 32,403 || 34–50
|- align="center" bgcolor="bbffbb"
| 85 || July 9 || @ Padres || 6–5 || Harikkala (3–1) || Hoffman (2–1) || Chacón (20) || 41,168 || 35–50
|- align="center" bgcolor="bbffbb"
| 86 || July 10 || @ Padres || 6–2 || Cook (4–3) || Lawrence (10–6) || || 37,644 || 36–50
|- align="center" bgcolor="ffbbbb"
| 87 || July 11 || @ Padres || 4–2 || Valdez (8–5) || Stark (0–4) || Hoffman (23) || 41,188 || 36–51
|- align="center" bgcolor="ffbbbb"
| 88 || July 15 || Giants || 7–5 || Brower (6–5) || Chacón (1–6) || Eyre (1) || 30,159 || 36–52
|- align="center" bgcolor="bbffbb"
| 89 || July 16 || Giants || 7–1 || Estes (9–4) || Rueter (5–7) || || 31,583 || 37–52
|- align="center" bgcolor="ffbbbb"
| 90 || July 17 || Giants || 4–0 || Schmidt (12–2) || Cook (4–4) || || 41,450 || 37–53
|- align="center" bgcolor="bbffbb"
| 91 || July 18 || Giants || 10–9 || Harikkala (4–1) || Herges (4–4) || || 35,032 || 38–53
|- align="center" bgcolor="ffbbbb"
| 92 || July 19 || Padres || 13–6 || Valdez (9–5) || Stark (0–5) || || 25,530 || 38–54
|- align="center" bgcolor="ffbbbb"
| 93 || July 20 || Padres || 9–7 || Eaton (5–8) || Jennings (8–8) || Hoffman (25) || 26,770 || 38–55
|- align="center" bgcolor="bbffbb"
| 94 || July 21 || @ Dodgers || 6–5 || Estes (10–4) || Ishii (11–5) || Chacón (21) || 34,343 || 39–55
|- align="center" bgcolor="ffbbbb"
| 95 || July 22 || @ Dodgers || 4–2 || Mota (8–3) || Harikkala (4–2) || Gagné (28) || 34,276 || 39–56
|- align="center" bgcolor="bbffbb"
| 96 || July 23 || @ Diamondbacks || 8–2 || Fassero (2–6) || Fossum (2–9) || || 26,350 || 40–56
|- align="center" bgcolor="bbffbb"
| 97 || July 24 || @ Diamondbacks || 8–2 || Wright (1–0) || Cormier (0–2) || || 31,409 || 41–56
|- align="center" bgcolor="bbffbb"
| 98 || July 25 || @ Diamondbacks || 3–2 || Jennings (9–8) || Choate (1–2) || Chacón (22) || 29,298 || 42–56
|- align="center" bgcolor="ffbbbb"
| 99 || July 26 || Dodgers || 9–7 || Sánchez (2–1) || Simpson (0–1) || Gagné (29) || 24,725 || 42–57
|- align="center" bgcolor="bbffbb"
| 100 || July 27 || Dodgers || 7–2 || Cook (5–4) || Pérez (4–4) || || 27,934 || 43–57
|- align="center" bgcolor="bbffbb"
| 101 || July 28 || Dodgers || 5–4 || Reed (2–2) || Mota (8–4) || Chacón (23) || 25,492 || 44–57
|- align="center" bgcolor="ffbbbb"
| 102 || July 29 || Dodgers || 3–2 || Álvarez (6–3) || Dohmann (0–1) || Gagné (30) || 28,472 || 44–58
|- align="center" bgcolor="bbffbb"
| 103 || July 30 || Diamondbacks || 4–1 || Jennings (10–8) || Johnson (10–9) || Chacón (24) || 29,436 || 45–58
|- align="center" bgcolor="bbffbb"
| 104 || July 31 || Diamondbacks || 8–4 || Estes (11–4) || Webb (4–12) || Chacón (25) || 32,392 || 46–58
|-

|-  bgcolor="ffbbbb"
|- align="center" bgcolor="bbffbb"
| 105 || August 1 || Diamondbacks || 10–2 || Cook (6–4) || González (0–4) || || 24,193 || 47–58
|- align="center" bgcolor="ffbbbb"
| 106 || August 3 || Cubs || 5–3 || Wood (6–4) || Fassero (2–7) || Hawkins (17) || 40,716 || 47–59
|- align="center" bgcolor="ffbbbb"
| 107 || August 4 || Cubs || 11–8 || Farnsworth (4–3) || Chacón (1–7) || || 45,305 || 47–60
|- align="center" bgcolor="ffbbbb"
| 108 || August 5 || Cubs || 5–1 || Prior (3–2) || Jennings (10–9) || Rusch (1) || 38,195 || 47–61
|- align="center" bgcolor="bbffbb"
| 109 || August 6 || Reds || 8–5 || Estes (12–4) || Claussen (1–2) || Chacón (26) || 26,187 || 48–61
|- align="center" bgcolor="bbffbb"
| 110 || August 7 || Reds || 9–5 || Simpson (1–1) || Wilson (9–3) || || 33,649 || 49–61
|- align="center" bgcolor="ffbbbb"
| 111 || August 8 || Reds || 14–7 || Lidle (7–10) || Fassero (2–8) || || 28,721 || 49–62
|- align="center" bgcolor="bbffbb"
| 112 || August 9 || @ Phillies || 4–2 || Harikkala (5–2) || Jones (8–3) || Chacón (27) || 42,031 || 50–62
|- align="center" bgcolor="bbffbb"
| 113 || August 10 || @ Phillies || 5–4 || Reed (3–2) || Worrell (3–5) || Chacón (28) || 36,636 || 51–62
|- align="center" bgcolor="ffbbbb"
| 114 || August 11 || @ Phillies || 15–4 || Wolf (5–7) || Jennings (10–10) || || 40,634 || 51–63
|- align="center" bgcolor="bbffbb"
| 115 || August 12 || @ Phillies || 3–1 || Estes (13–4) || Lidle (7–11) || Chacón (29) || 37,464 || 52–63
|- align="center" bgcolor="bbffbb"
| 116 || August 13 || @ Pirates || 9–3 || Fassero (3–8) || Wells (5–7) || || 27,522 || 53–63
|- align="center" bgcolor="ffbbbb"
| 117 || August 14 || @ Pirates || 6–1 || Pérez (8–6) || Wright (1–1) || || 37,312 || 53–64
|- align="center" bgcolor="ffbbbb"
| 118 || August 15 || @ Pirates || 3–0 || Fogg (7–8) || Kennedy (5–5) || Mesa (33) || 24,862 || 53–65
|- align="center" bgcolor="bbffbb"
| 119 || August 17 || Mets || 6–4 || Jennings (11–10) || Wheeler (3–1) || Chacón (30) || 34,387 || 54–65
|- align="center" bgcolor="ffbbbb"
| 120 || August 19 || Mets || 10–3 || Benson (10–9) || Estes (13–5) || || 30,827 || 54–66
|- align="center" bgcolor="ffbbbb"
| 121 || August 19 || Mets || 4–2 || Stanton (1–5) || Reed (3–3) || || 29,918 || 54–67
|- align="center" bgcolor="ffbbbb"
| 122 || August 20 || Expos || 4–3 || Ayala (5–9) || Fuentes (1–3) || Cordero (13) || 32,707 || 54–68
|- align="center" bgcolor="bbffbb"
| 123 || August 21 || Expos || 5–2 || Kennedy (6–5) || Hernández (9–11) || || 33,225 || 55–68
|- align="center" bgcolor="ffbbbb"
| 124 || August 22 || Expos || 8–2 || Patterson (3–2) || Jennings (11–11) || || 26,833 || 55–69
|- align="center" bgcolor="ffbbbb"
| 125 || August 24 || @ Braves || 6–5 || Gryboski (2–2) || Harikkala (5–3) || Smoltz (33) || 27,914 || 55–70
|- align="center" bgcolor="ffbbbb"
| 126 || August 25 || @ Braves || 8–1 || Thomson (10–8) || Francis (0–1) || || 25,534 || 55–71
|- align="center" bgcolor="ffbbbb"
| 127 || August 26 || @ Braves || 6–4 || Hampton (10–9) || Wright (1–2) || Smoltz (34) || 28,360 || 55–72
|- align="center" bgcolor="ffbbbb"
| 128 || August 27 || @ Marlins || 3–0 || Valdez (11–7) || Kennedy (6–6) || Benítez (37) || 26,735 || 55–73
|- align="center" bgcolor="ffbbbb"
| 129 || August 28 || @ Marlins || 4–3 || Pavano (15–5) || Reed (3–4) || Benítez (38) || 35,243 || 55–74
|- align="center" bgcolor="ffbbbb"
| 130 || August 29 || @ Marlins || 8–4 || Burnett (5–6) || Estes (13–6) || || 39,104 || 55–75
|- align="center" bgcolor="ffbbbb"
| 131 || August 31 || @ Giants || 9–5 || Tomko (8–6) || Francis (0–2) || Hermanson (8) || 38,305 || 55–76
|-

|-  bgcolor="ffbbbb"
|- align="center" bgcolor="bbffbb"
| 132 || September 1 || @ Giants || 4–1 || Wright (2–2) || Rueter (7–11) || Chacón (31) || 36,024 || 56–76
|- align="center" bgcolor="bbffbb"
| 133 || September 2 || @ Giants || 6–5 || Kennedy (7–6) || Schmidt (15–6) || Chacón (32) || 36,971 || 57–76
|- align="center" bgcolor="ffbbbb"
| 134 || September 3 || @ Padres || 7–6 || Linebrink (6–1) || Dohmann (0–2) || Hoffman (34) || 35,555 || 57–77
|- align="center" bgcolor="bbffbb"
| 135 || September 4 || @ Padres || 8–2 || Estes (14–6) || Tankersley (0–5) || || 42,716 || 58–77
|- align="center" bgcolor="bbffbb"
| 136 || September 5 || @ Padres || 5–2 || Francis (1–2) || Lawrence (13–12) || || 33,272 || 59–77
|- align="center" bgcolor="bbffbb"
| 137 || September 7 || Giants || 8–7 || Harikkala (6–3) || Christiansen (4–3) || Chacón (33) || 30,803 || 60–77
|- align="center" bgcolor="ffbbbb"
| 138 || September 8 || Giants || 5–3 || Walker (5–1) || Reed (3–5) || Hermanson (11) || 24,700 || 60–78
|- align="center" bgcolor="bbffbb"
| 139 || September 9 || Padres || 9–7 || López (1–2) || Linebrink (7–2) || Chacón (34) || 20,027 || 61–78
|- align="center" bgcolor="ffbbbb"
| 140 || September 10 || Padres || 10–4 || Lawrence (14–12) || Harikkala (6–4) || || 22,279 || 61–79
|- align="center" bgcolor="bbffbb"
| 141 || September 11 || Padres || 13–2 || Francis (2–2) || Eaton (9–13) || || 22,684 || 62–79
|- align="center" bgcolor="ffbbbb"
| 142 || September 12 || Padres || 15–2 || Peavy (12–5) || Reed (3–6) || || 21,608 || 62–80
|- align="center" bgcolor="bbffbb"
| 143 || September 13 || @ Diamondbacks || 9–2 || Kennedy (8–6) || Fossum (4–13) || || 22,070 || 63–80
|- align="center" bgcolor="ffbbbb"
| 144 || September 14 || @ Diamondbacks || 4–3 (13) || Choate (2–3) || Reed (3–7) || || 23,175 || 63–81
|- align="center" bgcolor="ffbbbb"
| 145 || September 15 || @ Diamondbacks || 3–2 || Johnson (14–13) || Estes (14–7) || Aquino (12) || 22,598 || 63–82
|- align="center" bgcolor="ffbbbb"
| 146 || September 16 || @ Diamondbacks || 8–5 || Durbin (6–6) || Dohmann (0–3) || Fetters (1) || 22,281 || 63–83
|- align="center" bgcolor="ffbbbb"
| 147 || September 17 || Dodgers || 8–6 (10) || Gagné (7–3) || Chacón (1–8) || || 23,572 || 63–84
|- align="center" bgcolor="bbffbb"
| 148 || September 18 || Dodgers || 8–1 || Kennedy (9–6) || Pérez (6–6) || || 21,664 || 64–84
|- align="center" bgcolor="ffbbbb"
| 149 || September 19 || Dodgers || 7–6 || Brazobán (2–0) || Chacón (1–9) || Gagné (42) || 27,175 || 64–85
|- align="center" bgcolor="bbffbb"
| 150 || September 22 || Diamondbacks || 4–2 || Estes (15–7) || Johnson (14–14) || Chacón (35) || 20,125 || 65–85
|- align="center" bgcolor="bbffbb"
| 151 || September 23 || Diamondbacks || 7–1 || Francis (3–2) || Webb (6–16) || || || 66–85
|- align="center" bgcolor="bbffbb"
| 152 || September 23 || Diamondbacks || 2–1 (10) || Simpson (2–1) || Choate (2–4) || || 20,765 || 67–85
|- align="center" bgcolor="ffbbbb"
| 153 || September 24 || Cardinals || 5–4 || Suppan (16–8) || Jennings (11–12) || Calero (2) || 45,053 || 67–86
|- align="center" bgcolor="ffbbbb"
| 154 || September 25 || Cardinals || 10–6 || Flores (2–0) || Harikkala (6–5) || Isringhausen (46) || 29,751 || 67–87
|- align="center" bgcolor="ffbbbb"
| 155 || September 26 || Cardinals || 9–3 || Marquis (15–6) || Gissell (0–1) || Eldred (1) || 26,866 || 67–88
|- align="center" bgcolor="ffbbbb"
| 156 || September 27 || @ Dodgers || 8–7 || Brazobán (4–1) || Reed (3–8) || || 36,958 || 67–89
|- align="center" bgcolor="ffbbbb"
| 157 || September 28 || @ Dodgers || 5–4 || Dessens (2–6) || Harikkala (6–6) || || 33,588 || 67–90
|- align="center" bgcolor="bbffbb"
| 158 || September 29 || @ Dodgers || 4–1 || Fuentes (2–3) || Brazobán (4–2) || Tsao (1) || 43,304 || 68–90
|- align="center" bgcolor="ffbbbb"
| 159 || September 30 || @ Dodgers || 4–2 (11) || Brazobán (5–2) || Fuentes (2–4) || || 53,438 || 68–91
|-

|-  bgcolor="ffbbbb"
|- align="center" bgcolor="ffbbbb"
| 160 || October 1 || @ Astros || 4–2 || Gallo (2–0) || Kennedy (9–7) || Lidge (28) || 41,717 || 68–92
|- align="center" bgcolor="ffbbbb"
| 161 || October 2 || @ Astros || 9–3 || Oswalt (20–10) || Estes (15–8) || || 43,279 || 68–93
|- align="center" bgcolor="ffbbbb"
| 162 || October 3 || @ Astros || 5–3 || Backe (5–3) || Wright (2–3) || Lidge (29) || 43,082 || 68–94
|-

Player stats

Batting

Starters by position 
Note: Pos = Position; G = Games played; AB = At bats; H = Hits; Avg. = Batting average; HR = Home runs; RBI = Runs batted in

Other batters 
Note: G = Games played; AB = At bats; H = Hits; Avg. = Batting average; HR = Home runs; RBI = Runs batted in

Pitching

Starting pitchers 
Note: G = Games pitched; IP = Innings pitched; W = Wins; L = Losses; ERA = Earned run average; SO = Strikeouts

Other pitchers 
Note: G = Games pitched; IP = Innings pitched; W = Wins; L = Losses; ERA = Earned run average; SO = Strikeouts

Relief pitchers 
Note: G = Games pitched; W = Wins; L = Losses; SV = Saves; ERA = Earned run average; SO = Strikeouts

Farm system

References

2004 Colorado Rockies at Baseball Reference
2004 Colorado Rockies team page at www.baseball-almanac.com

Colorado Rockies seasons
Colorado Rockies season
Colorado Rockies
2000s in Denver